Josef Javůrek (19 May 1876 – 20 October 1942) was a Czech fencer. He competed at three Olympic Games.

References

1876 births
1942 deaths
Czechoslovak male fencers
Czech male fencers
Olympic fencers of Bohemia
Olympic fencers of Czechoslovakia
Fencers at the 1912 Summer Olympics
Fencers at the 1920 Summer Olympics
Fencers at the 1924 Summer Olympics
Sportspeople from Eger
Sportspeople from the Austro-Hungarian Empire